Cătălin Ungur (born 1 August 1994) is a Romanian swimmer. He competed in the men's 100 metre backstroke event at the 2018 FINA World Swimming Championships (25 m), in Hangzhou, China.

References

External links
 

1994 births
Living people
Romanian male backstroke swimmers
Place of birth missing (living people)
20th-century Romanian people
21st-century Romanian people